The 2005 edition of the Kyrgyzstan Cup was the annual Kyrgyzstan football competition between domestic clubs.

Play-off round

First round
The first round matches were played on 17 April 2005.

|}
Byes: FK Naryn, Svetotekhnika Maylusuu.

Second round
The second round matches were played on 20 April 2005.

|}
Byes: FK Batken, Metallurg Kadamjay, Alay Osh, Asyl Jalal-Abad, Shakhtyor Tash-Kömür.

Round of 16
The  Round of 16 matches were played between 2–11 May 2005.

|}

NB: Metallurg Kadamjay changed name to Kurban-100 Kadamjay.

Quarterfinals 
The  Quarterfinals  matches was played between 17 May-1 June  2005.

|}

Semifinals 
The first legs was  played on 4 June, and the second legs was  played on 8 June  2005.

|}

Finals 
The final of the Kyrgyzstan Cup 2005 was held on 1 September 2005 at the  Spartak Stadium  in Bishkek.

Attendance: 7,200

Referee: Mashentsev (Osh).

|}

References

Kyrgyzstan Cup seasons
Cup

it:Campionato di calcio del Kirghizistan
pl:I liga kirgiska w piłce nożnej